HeavyLift International was an aviation cargo airlines company that operated from Sharjah International Airport in the United Arab Emirates. It began operations in 2004 and ceased operations in 2011.

Fleet
Its fleet consisted of the following planes:

References

Defunct airlines of the United Arab Emirates
Airlines established in 2004
Airlines disestablished in 2011
Cargo airlines of the United Arab Emirates
Emirati companies established in 2004